Alif Allah (Jugni), also known as Alif Allah Chambe Di Booti is a popular Punjabi Sufi song that was composed and sung by Arif Lohar and Meesha Shafi in Coke Studio Pakistan. The lyrics of the song were based on the works of 17th century Sufi poet Sultan Bahu.
It is an adaptation of Punjabi folk "Jugni" in a Sufi version.

Alif Allah (Jugni) rose to popularity after being sung by Lohar and Shafi on Coke Studio. The associated video on YouTube has more than 70 million views to date.

Adaptation in films and television 
The song has also been used in the following movies:
 Pakistani Lollywood Punjabi language film Jugni - 2011
 Bollywood movie Cocktail where it was sung by Arif Lohar and Harshdeep Kaur. - 2012
 Bollywood movie Diary of a Butterfly - 2012
 Ta'Wiz - 2018 (Upcoming Hum TV program)

References

Punjabi-language songs
Sufi music
2010 songs
Sufism in Pakistan
Coke Studio (Pakistani TV program)